Thrixion is a genus of parasitic flies in the family Tachinidae. There are at least two described species in Thrixion.

Species
These two species belong to the genus Thrixion:
 Thrixion aberrans (Schiner, 1861)
 Thrixion pilifrons Mesnil, 1963

References

Further reading

 
 
 
 

Tachinidae
Articles created by Qbugbot